The Massif du Sud Wind Project is a wind project being developed by EDF Énergies Nouvelles and Enbridge. It is located near the villages of Saint-Philémon, Quebec and Saint-Magloire, Quebec. Comprising 75 REpower Systems 2-megawatt wind turbines, at completion the project will achieve a nameplate capacity of 150 MW.

See also

List of wind farms in Canada

References

Buildings and structures in Gaspésie–Îles-de-la-Madeleine
Wind farms in Quebec